Walla! Communications Ltd. is an Israeli internet company headquartered in Tel Aviv and is fully owned by The Jerusalem Post. Until 2020, it was fully owned by Bezeq. Walla!'s web portal provides news, search (powered by Google Search) and e-mail, among other things. It is also one of the first Israeli internet portals, and is considered one of the most popular web sites in the country. , Alexa rankings put it in the top 9 sites by traffic originating in Israel. Its online news outlet Walla! News is one of the major Israeli news websites.

The outlet has been accused of biased media reporting in favour of former Prime Minister Benjamin Netanyahu. Employees of the company have been summoned as witnesses in Case 4000, one of the corruption trials involving Netanyahu.

History
The portal was founded by Erez Pilosof and Gadi Hadar in 1995 as Israel's first online website directory, and soon afterward acquired by "Mashov Computers Marketing", a member of The Mashov Group headed by Yaki Dunietz and David Assia. In 1998, the company, traded on the Tel Aviv Stock Exchange, changed its name to "Walla! Communications Ltd". In the same year, the company was acquired by Formula Systems, headed by Dan Goldstein, and in 2001 it merged with IOL, a similar site run by the Haaretz Group.

Services
Most news stories that appear in Walla! came from the Haaretz Group, news agencies and other content providers. However, during the year 2006, Walla! started building an independent news and editorial staff, which produces original news stories and special features. In addition, Walla! produces original content in various fields such as sports, cinema, music, fashion and food. The website offers many programs and services, a search engine, E-mail, online shops, chats, and video on demand.

Controversy over ties to Netanyahu family
In December 2020, Bezeq owner Shaul Elovitch, his son and former Bezeq director Or Elovitch; former secretary Linor Yochelman, the former CEO of Yes, Bezeq's satellite TV subsidiary, Ron Eilon and former Yes CFO Mickey Naiman were indicted on charges of fraud, breach of trust, receiving illicit gifts and violations of the Securities Law. A substantial portion of the charges also concerned Walla! 's alleged favoritism towards Israeli Prime Minister Benjamin Netanyahu. Former Bezeq CEO Stella Handler wasn't indicted after agreeing to cooperate with prosecutors. On April 5, 2021, former Walla! CEO Ilan Yeshua testified that Shaul Elovitch ordered him to not report negative stories about Netanyahu. Yashua also testified that Shaul ordered him to also attack Netanyahu's political rivals and post stories favorable about the Israeli Prime Minister as well. On April 12, 2021, Yeshua told the Jerusalem District Court that Netanyahu was the "big guy" who persuaded Walla! to publish only parts of an interview he conducted with journalist Dov Gilhar a week before the March 2021 Israeli election, and that "any negative item led to outburst" from the Israeli Prime Minister. Yeshua also revealed a February 2015 text message which Shaul Elovitch sent to him in February 2015. In the text message, Elovitch stated that he had a problematic meeting with Netanyahu, whom he referred to as "the big one".

On April 20, 2021, Yeshua detailed more instances where Netanyahu showed authority over the editorials at Walla!, such as telling Elovitch to take down a news story which appeared on Walla! about a romantic relationship between Netanyahu's son Yair and a non-Jewish Norwegian woman, and also his requests for using the news site as a way to spread attacks on Naftali Bennett and his wife Gilat. On May 4, 2021, Yeshua stated that the Israeli Prime Minister also got Walla! to remove stories about "bereaved" families of Israeli soldiers who were killed during the 2014 Gaza War and whose remains were still held by Hamas. One notable family was the family of Hadar Goldin, an IDF soldier whose remains have been held by Hamas in Gaza since the 2016 war. He did not clarify who told the editors to erase these stories. However, he also noted how the Prime Minister's wife Sara Netanyahu also had influence at Walla! and how Netanyahu associate Zeev Rubinstein, whom he described as the "their senior officer in the Byzantine court", was used to carry out Sara's "crazy requests and angles."

References

External links
 Walla! News Official Website

Internet properties established in 1995
Companies based in Tel Aviv
Companies listed on the Tel Aviv Stock Exchange
Online companies of Israel
Israeli news websites
Israeli brands
Hebrew-language websites
Video on demand services
Websites which mirror Wikipedia
Web portals